Parliamentary elections were held in Finland on 21 and 22 September 1975.

Background
Prime Minister Kalevi Sorsa's Social Democratic Party government survived until June 1975.  It resigned because of internal disagreements over the ways to combat Finland's recession, which had largely been caused by the 1973 oil crisis, as well as the government's increased spending and taxes. The Social Democrats and Centre Party also disagreed on regional policy over the extent to which the national government should re-distribute power and tax revenues to cities, towns and administrative provinces.

President Urho Kekkonen had gradually become dissatisfied with the performance of Prime Minister Sorsa, Finance Minister Johannes Virolainen and Foreign Minister Ahti Karjalainen: either they were not competent, diligent or courageous enough, or they spent too much time in partisan disputes, or - in Virolainen's case, especially - their foreign policy ability or understanding was not good enough. Although Helsinki was to host the Conference on Security and Co-operation in Europe (CSCE) at the end of July and at the start of August 1975, Kekkonen did not worry about the possibly negative effect on Finland's international image of having a caretaker government. He appointed it, and chose Keijo Liinamaa of the Social Democratic Party as Prime Minister, who was the state labour disputes mediator.

Campaign
The opposition parties campaigned with varied slogans; the Finnish People's Democratic League claimed to be loyal supporters of Kekkonen's foreign policy towards the Soviet Union and to be even more faithful defenders of the working class than the Social Democrats; the National Coalition Party promised voters lower taxes and more security; the Finnish Rural Party bitterly condemned Kekkonen's allegedly authoritarian presidency, and his "servile" foreign policy towards the Soviet Union.

The right-wing Constitutional People's Party accused Kekkonen of violating the Constitution's spirit by forcing Parliament to re-elect him as President through an exceptional law in 1973, and the Finnish Christian League kept opposing abortion, pornography, the sale of beer in grocery stores, and the public mocking of Christian values.

Results

Aftermath
Government formation in the midst of a quickly deepening recession and after an inconclusive election proved very painstaking. Veteran Centrist politician Martti Miettunen finally succeeded, with the help of Kekkonen's strongly-worded televised speech, in forming a centre-left majority "emergency" government in November 1975.  It lasted until September 1976, when the Social Democrats and Finnish People's Democratic League left it.  Miettunen then formed a centrist minority government.

References

General elections in Finland
Finland
Parliament
Finland
Election and referendum articles with incomplete results